Palikúr (Brazilian Portuguese: Palicur, French: Palikur) is an Arawakan language of Brazil and French Guiana. Knowledge of French and Portuguese is common, and French Guianese Creole is used as the common language among the tribes in the area and with the local population. Palikúr is considered endangered in French Guiana and vulnerable in Brazil.

Phonology

Consonants 

 Plosives in word-final position are heard unreleased as [p̚, t̚, k̚, b̚, d̚, ɡ̚].
 /t, d, n/ when before front vowels /i, ĩ/ are heard as palatal and post-alveolar sounds [tʃ, dʒ, ɲ].

Vowels 

 /e, o/ are heard as [ɛ, ɔ] within different positions.
 /a/ is heard as a nasalized central vowel sound [ɐ̃] when preceding a nasal consonant.

Loanwords
Palikúr has several loanwords, many of which are wildlife-related, from the Carib language, including:

Pronouns
Palikúr has dependent and independent personal pronouns. The verb marks the object by using suffixes, but not the subject, which must appear in the form of a nominal group or as an independent pronoun. This affixation of only the object and not of the subject is linguistically very rare: the norm is the affixation for both or for only the subject. The noun complement is marked by a possessive prefix.

References

External links

Arawakan languages
Languages of Brazil
Languages of French Guiana